Rock Hudson's Home Movies is a 1992 documentary by Mark Rappaport. It shows clips from Rock Hudson's films that could be interpreted as gay entendres.

Summary
Eric Farr speaks to the camera as if speaking Rock Hudson's words from a posthumous diary. Film clips from more than 30 Hudson films illustrate ways in which his sexual orientation played out on screen. First there are tenuous and unresolved relationships with women, then clips of Rock with men, cruising and circling. Second, there is pedagogical eros: Hudson with older men. Rock is seen with his male sidekicks, often Tony Randall.

Analysis
Next, the film looks in depth at comedies of sexual embarrassment and innuendo: films in which Hudson sometimes plays two characters, "macho Rock and homo Rock." Lastly, the film reflects on Hudson's death from AIDS.

See also
The Celluloid Closet
Douglas Sirk
Essay film

References

External links 

Fandor
MUBI

1992 films
American documentary films
Documentary films about LGBT film
Documentary films about actors
1992 documentary films
1992 LGBT-related films
Documentary films about films
American LGBT-related films
Collage film
1990s English-language films
1990s American films